Zofia z Radziwiłłów Dorohostajska  (1577-1614), was a Polish noblewoman. She is known as the central figure of a famous scandal, in which she was exposed with adultery and as a punishment imprisoned by her husband and forced to submit to a life of penitence, an affair that attracted considerable attention in contemporary Poland.

References

 Jan Seredyka, Księżniczka i chudopachołek , Wyd. Uniwersytetu Opolskiego, Opole 1995,  .

17th-century Polish nobility
17th-century Polish women
1614 deaths
1577 births
Radziwiłł family